Vanadis may refer to:
Vanadís, an additional name of the Norse goddess Freyja
USS Vanadis (AKA-49), an Artemis-class attack cargo ship
TS Vanadis, 1908 motor yacht
Vanadis, 1924 motor yacht also named Lady Hutton and now a hotel docked in Stockholm
240 Vanadis, a main-belt asteroid
Vanadis (polychaete), a genus of polychaetes in the family Phyllodocidae

See also
Lord Marksman and Vanadis, a Japanese light novel series